Ferenc Kemény (15 June 1922 – May 2002) was a Hungarian gymnast. He competed in eight events at the 1952 Summer Olympics.

References

External links
 

1922 births
2002 deaths
Hungarian male artistic gymnasts
Olympic gymnasts of Hungary
Gymnasts at the 1952 Summer Olympics
People from Nyíregyháza
Sportspeople from Szabolcs-Szatmár-Bereg County